Angelo Anthony Coia (April 21, 1938 – January 2, 2013) was an American football end in the National Football League (NFL) for the Chicago Bears, the Washington Redskins, and the Atlanta Falcons.

Biography
Coia played college football at the University of Southern California (USC) and The Citadel and was selected in the 20th round of the 1960 NFL Draft.  He attended Northeast Public High School in Philadelphia and was a teammate of future Green Bay Packer Herb Adderley there.  At Northeast, Coia starred as a football player at halfback and with Adderley helped lead the team to the 1955 Public League Championship.   He also was the city sprint champion at 220 yards in track.

After his NFL career, Coia was a racehorse owner and worked as a scout for the Raiders. Before his death, Coia was a resident of Brigantine, New Jersey.

References

1938 births
2013 deaths
American football ends
American football wide receivers
Atlanta Falcons players
Chicago Bears players
People from Brigantine, New Jersey
USC Trojans football players
The Citadel Bulldogs football players
Washington Redskins players
Players of American football from Philadelphia